Anna Matthes (born 5 March 1998) is a German modern pentathlete.

She participated at the 2018 World Modern Pentathlon Championships, winning a medal.

References

External links
 
 
 
 

1998 births
Living people
German female modern pentathletes
World Modern Pentathlon Championships medalists
Modern pentathletes at the 2014 Summer Youth Olympics
21st-century German women